The Desert Springs Cricket Ground is a sports ground in Almeria, Spain. In September 2019, it was selected to host the Germany's tour of Spain in March 2020, which included two Twenty20 International (T20I) cricket matches between Spain and Germany. The ground has also been used by Derbyshire, Lancashire and Somerset for training ahead of the start of the cricket season in England. In April 2021, the International Cricket Council (ICC) gave accreditation for the stadium to host One Day International (ODI) cricket matches.

See also
 Spain national cricket team

References

External links
 Cricinfo Profile
 Official Website

Sport in Spain
Cricket grounds in Spain
Cricket in Spain